Kuwait University Stadium is a multi-purpose stadium in Shuwaikh Educational, Capital, Kuwait City.  It is currently used mostly for football matches for several local clubs.  The stadium holds 16,000 people.

History
The stadium was opened on 1953 under the name of Shuwaikh High School Stadium. It's holds on past many importants events such as 1964 Arab Nations Cup.

References

External links
Stadium information - goalzz.com

Football venues in Kuwait
Multi-purpose stadiums in Kuwait